The 1973 Winston 500 was the tenth round of the 1973 NASCAR Winston Cup Series held on May 6, 1973, at Alabama International Motor Speedway (now Talladega Superspeedway) in Talladega, Alabama (AIMS).

The race was won by David Pearson. His car was the only one on the lead lap at the end of the race.

Also notable was a fourth-place finish by Clarence Lovell, This was Lovell's best career finish and his only finish in the top five of a NASCAR Cup race. Lovell would die five days later on May 11, in a single vehicle truck accident which occurred while he was trying to change a tape in a dashboard-mounted tape deck.

Eddie Yarboro fell out of this race with a mechanical issue in the opening laps before the "Big One." This was Yarboro's only Cup start of the season and his last in the series overall, the self-owned independent had largely switched over to racing in NASCAR's more short-track focused Grand National East Series for 1973 and made a few more starts there later in the summer before dropping off the national stage.

Background
For the 1973 Winston 500 race, the usual starting field of 50 was expanded to 60 by track management, and this would later prove controversial due to events in the race. Factions in the NASCAR management wanted to have a larger field that'd attract more fans to watch the races, and that a larger field with a bigger purse would catch the eyes of more teams. Of course, they were warned that starting 60 cars would be a strain at the track, and might be potentially hazardous for drivers (even when compared to NASCAR in the 21st century), but the NASCAR management ignored it, and, it resulted in this infamous race.

Summary

Pre-race ceremonies 
Then Alabama governor George Wallace would be named the grand marshal for the event, while his wife Cornelia Wallace would drive the pace car. Before the race, George, who ten years earlier had tried to lead the Stand in the Schoolhouse Door, put out his hand to the only black driver racing that day, Wendell Scott. The two shook hands, and a photographer took a picture. According to Hard Driving: The Wendell Scott Story, Scott's expression on his face was "inscrutable".

"The Big One"
On lap 9, Ramo Stott's engine let go, dumping oil onto the speedway's asphalt. Wendell Scott, behind him, spun out, and both cars skidded into Talladega's infield, creating a massive cloud of dirt and dust. The combination of oil on the track and suddenly limited visibility caused a massive pileup. 23 cars were involved.

One contemporary recorded film account called it "The worst accident in NASCAR history", in terms of the number of cars involved.

All drivers were able to leave their cars under their own power. Buddy Baker and Cale Yarborough were eliminated, and when they got out of their cars they had to dodge additional cars crashing around them. Some drivers did have injuries. Several received lacerations; Earl Brooks had a broken hand, Joe Frasson had shoulder injuries, and Slick Gardner suffered a knee injury. Wendell Scott, who was covered in blood everywhere on his body, would suffer the worst injuries: a fractured left leg, fractured pelvis in numerous places, broke three ribs, ripped most of the skin from his left forearm, and would seriously injure his right kidney. His arm bone was also visible and poking out, according to Frank Scott, Wendell's son. The crash would ultimately lead to Scott's retirement.

Bobby Allison, one of the drivers eliminated in the lap 9/10 wreck, later ripped the track's management for the field size of 60 set by track management - "They (filled the field) all right, all over the backstretch." Joe Frasson, already bloodied said "I hope to hell France is happy. NASCAR had no business starting 60 cars."

Cleanup from the wreck proceeded under 37 laps of a yellow flag, lasting one hour and five minutes. 19 cars were eliminated outright. A few others, including that of Richard Petty, were repaired and eventually ran more laps.

David Pearson lost the lead draft and Buddy Baker said that Pearson fouled out the spark plugs on his Mercury and then got them replaced under the lengthy yellow.

After the wreck
On lap 73, the engine of D. K. Ulrich's car dumped oil onto the track and caused another caution. Before this caution is over, Darrell Waltrip's car was retired due to a blown piston.

Pearson's number 21 car was not left with much competition after the large lap 9 accident. He stretched out a very wide lead by the end of the race.

On lap 185, Vic Parsons' engine failed, and his car slipped in the dumped oil, causing a crash, with the race ending under safety car conditions. Pearson was the only car on the lead lap at the end of the race at the end of the 500 miles.

Race results
Cautions: 4 for 54 laps

Margin of victory: 1 lap +

Lead changes: 13

References

Winston 500
Winston 500
Winston 500
NASCAR races at Talladega Superspeedway